Ngumba may refer to: a village found in Lutengano, Tukuyu within the Rungwe district in Mbeya region. Mbeya is found in the western southern highlands of Tanzania. Inhabitants of the Ngumba village are traditionally of Nyakyusa tribe although in modern days the village has attracted people from other parts of the country.

Main economic activity of people living in Ngumba is agriculture. the land rich in soil fertility is suitable for cultivation of Bananas, Coffee, Tea, Ginger, maize, potatoes, beans, and various vegetables.

Ngumba language of Cameroon
Ngumba people of Cameroon